NNiels George Steenberg (31 November 1839 - 6 February 1915) was a Danish engineer who played an important role in the development of Denmark's chemical industry. He was professor of Technical Chemistry at the Technical University of Denmark from 1894 and president of the Danish Association of Engineers from 1907 to 1910.

Early life and education
Steenberg was born in Copenhagen, the son of military surgeon  Frederik Steenberg (1802–59) and Johanne Caroline Tengstedt (1811–1901). He attended Melchior's School before enrolling at the College of Advanced Technology in 1855 from where he graduated in Applied Sciences in 1861.

Career
Steenberg worked as factory manager for Jacob Holm & Sønner from 1865. He was responsible for the construction of the company's new glue factory in Sundbyøster as well as for modernizing its soap production. He was also responsible for the creation of a new laboratory which resulted in the introduction of new instruments and production methods.In 1890 he visited England to buy machinery for a new string factory at the company's ropewalk on Amager.

Steenberg succeeded August Thomsens as teacher of technical chemistry at the College of Advanced Rechnology in 1784 and he was the following year appointed as professor.

Steenberg was a board member of numerous companies, including A/S Hertz' Garveri og Skotøjsfabrik (1897-), A/S Københavns Fodtøjsfabrik (1906-), A/S H. E. Gosch & Co. (1902-), A/S Kbh.s Tændstikfabrikker, Fabrikken Merkur and A/S Det Danske Moler-Selskab (1909-).

He was a member of Industriforeningen's board of representatives from  1896 to 1908 and a board member of Den tekniske forening from 1898 until his death. He was president of the Danish Association of Engineers from 1907 to 1910.

Personal life
Steenberg married on 27 July 1869 in Mårum Anna Dorothea Holten (1847-1884), daughter of forester Nicolai Holten (1815–88) and Sophie Margrethe Ulrich (1820–1903). He was after her death 20 May 1893 in Copenhagen married to Anna Dorothea Cecilia Mogensen (1857-1916), daughter of iron foundry-owner Jens Frederik Frantz Mogensen (1823–1900) and Anna Dorothea Schou (1829–1917).

He died on 6 February 1915 and is buried in Copenhagen's  Western Cemetery. He was created a Knight in the Order of the Dannebrog in 1903 and awarded the Cross of Honour in 1910. He is one of the men depicted in Peder Severin Krøyer's monumental group portrait painting Men of Industry.

References

External links

 Source

19th-century Danish engineers
20th-century Danish engineers
Danish chemists
Technical University of Denmark alumni
Knights of the Order of the Dannebrog
Recipients of the Cross of Honour of the Order of the Dannebrog
Burials at Vestre Cemetery, Copenhagen
1839 births
1915 deaths